The Kitashirakawa (北白川) ōke (princely house) was the fifth-oldest branch of the Japanese Imperial Family created from branches of the Fushimi-no-miya house.

Kitashirakawa-no-miya
The Kitashirakawa-no-miya house was formed by Prince Satonari, thirteenth son of Prince Fushimi Kuniye, in 1872. In 1947, Prince Kitashirakawa Michihisa lost his imperial status and became an ordinary citizen, as part of the American Occupation's abolition of the collateral branches of the Japanese Imperial family. Upon his death without male heirs on 20 October 2018, the main line of the Kitashirakawa-no-miya became extinct.

References 

 
History articles needing translation from Japanese Wikipedia